Balakhan Kandi (also Romanized as Bālākhān Kandī) is a village in Qeshlaq-e Jonubi Rural District, Qeshlaq Dasht District, Bileh Savar County, Ardabil Province, Iran. At the 2006 census, its population was 45, in 7 families.

References 

Towns and villages in Bileh Savar County